Bob Loonan (born July 29, 1960) is an American politician and former member of the Minnesota House of Representatives. A member of the Republican Party of Minnesota, he represented District 55A in the southwestern Twin Cities metropolitan area.

Early life
Loonan attended Saint John's University, graduating with a bachelor's degree.

Minnesota House of Representatives
Loonan was first elected to the Minnesota House of Representatives in 2014.

Loonan ran for re-election in 2018 but was defeated in the Republican primary by Erik Mortensen.

Loonan ran again in 2020 by lost in a rematch with Erik Mortensen in the Republican Primary

Personal life
Loonan is married to his wife, Denise. They have four children and reside in Shakopee, Minnesota.

References

External links

Bob Loonan official campaign website

1960 births
Living people
Republican Party members of the Minnesota House of Representatives
College of Saint Benedict and Saint John's University alumni
People from Shakopee, Minnesota
21st-century American politicians